Hermann Färber (born 26 March 1963) is a German farmer and politician of the Christian Democratic Union (CDU) who has been serving as a member of the Bundestag from the state of Baden-Württemberg since 2013.

Education 
Färber completed an apprenticeship as an agricultural machinery mechanic and farmer. He then attended a technical college for agriculture, from which he graduated as a state-certified economist for agriculture. This was followed by the agricultural master craftsman's examination. He managed his family farm for more than 25 years before becoming a member of the Bundestag.

Political career 
Färber joined the CDU in 2012, but was already a non-party member of the CDU Göppingen district council group from 2004 to 2009. In the internal party nomination on September 28, 2012, he was elected with 305 to 198 votes as a candidate for the 2013 federal election.
In the Bundestag election on September 22, 2013, Färber received 49.04% of the first-past-the-post votes, winning the direct mandate in the Göppingen constituency. He has been a member of the German Bundestag ever since, after being re-elected with 95.8 percent. In the 19th German Bundestag, Färber is a full member of the Committee on Food and Agriculture, the Committee on the Environment, Nature Conservation and Nuclear Safety, and the Petitions Committee. He is also a deputy member of the Parliamentary Advisory Council for Sustainable Development.

Since 2016 he is it deputy chairman of the CDU district association Göppingen.

Färber is a member of the CDU/CSU parliamentary group in the German Bundestag. In his parliamentary group, he is a member of the working groups on food and agriculture and petitions.

Political positions 
In June 2017, Färber voted against Germany's introduction of same-sex marriage.

Honorary offices and memberships 
 Chairman of the Göppingen District Farmers' Association since 1999
 Vice chairman of the CDU district association Göppingen
 President of the Hohenstaufen Choir Association
 Member of the Executive Board of the Landesbauernverband in Baden-Württemberg
 Member of the supervisory board of Buchstelle Landesbauernverband Baden-Württemberg GmbH
 Advisory board of the Kreissparkasse Göppingen
 Ambassador of the adventure region Schwäbischer Albtrauf
 Member of the Böhmenkirch volunteer fire department
 Member of the non-partisan Europa-Union Deutschland

References

External links 

  
 Bundestag biography 

1963 births
Living people
Members of the Bundestag for Baden-Württemberg
Members of the Bundestag 2021–2025
Members of the Bundestag 2017–2021
Members of the Bundestag 2013–2017
Members of the Bundestag for the Christian Democratic Union of Germany